The Charlotte Mecklenburg Library (previously the Public Library of Charlotte and Mecklenburg County) is the public library system of the city of Charlotte and Mecklenburg County in North Carolina.

About 
Charlotte Mecklenburg Library is one of America's many urban public libraries, serving a community of approximately one million citizens in the city of Charlotte and the towns of Matthews, Pineville, Mint Hill, Davidson, Cornelius and Huntersville – all located in Mecklenburg County, North Carolina.

Early history

Andrew Carnegie donated $25,000 to establish a public library in Charlotte in 1901. In early 1904, the city aldermen bought a lot at the corner of Brevard and East 2nd streets for a separate library for African Americans, the first of its kind in North Carolina. Although only six blocks from the Carnegie Library, it was in the heart of the Brooklyn neighborhood, the black city within the city of Charlotte where many black churches and most black-owned businesses and professional offices were located. It operated independently at first and after 1929 as a branch of the public library system before closing in 1961.

Growth of the Library System

The library system and the region grew tremendously in this period. The new, architecturally modern Main Library expanded its services to include a Carolina Room for local history and genealogy. In 1956, the library stopped segregating its customers by race and opened its services to all on an equal basis.

Under the leadership of, among others, Robert E. Cannon (1986-2003), the library added more branches, inaugurated a literary festival, remodeled the 1956 Main Library building, and brought its catalog online. It continued to grow into the 21st century, constructing the ImaginOn branch as a joint venture with the Children's Theatre of Charlotte.

The Modern Library

The economic recession of 2009-2011 brought significant budget reductions, resulting in employee layoffs, the closure of four library branches, reduced hours and services at all remaining locations, and the consolidation of several support functions with Mecklenburg County. But it was from this challenging time that the Library, County and community leaders found new ways to collaborate to meet the mutual goal of providing Mecklenburg County residents with the resources they needed to be successful. Today the Library's 20 locations include a Main Library, an innovative library for children and teens called ImaginOn, and a network of branch libraries throughout Mecklenburg County. Throughout the system, the Library provides free and open access to its physical and electronic collections and information, as well as to its services for people of all ages, from toddlers to teens to adults.

References 

Education in Charlotte, North Carolina
Public libraries in North Carolina
Carnegie libraries in North Carolina
Charlotte metropolitan area
Libraries in North Carolina
Education in Mecklenburg County, North Carolina